Saxifraga rosacea, or Irish saxifrage, is a herbaceous plant in the family Saxifragaceae.

It spreads by stolons, forming a compact cushion of short leafy shoots. Flowering stems may be up to 25cm tall, bearing 4-5 white flowers with petals 6-10mm long.

It is found in the west of the British Isles, and in Iceland. It became extinct in England in 1960. It is usually found by mountain streams, but also grows on cliffs and scree slopes.

References

rosacea